The 1969–70 Idaho State Bengals men's basketball team represented Idaho State University during the  NCAA University Division basketball season. Led by third-year head coach Dan Miller, the Bengals played their home games on campus at Reed Gym in Pocatello.

Junior guard Willie Humes averaged nearly 29 points per game and was unanimously selected to the all-conference team; junior guard O'Neill Simmons was on the second team.

The new ISU Minidome was completed after the season and became the new home court that autumn.

References

External links
Sports Reference – Idaho State Bengals – 1969–70 basketball season
Idaho State Bengals men's basketball – Year by year results

Idaho State Bengals men's basketball seasons
Idaho State
Idaho State